The 2006 Pot Black was a professional non-ranking snooker tournament that was held on 2 September 2006 at the Royal Automobile Club in London, England. All matches were played over one . Matthew Stevens was the defending champion, but lost in the first round 0–1 (64–70) against John Higgins.

Mark Williams won the final 1–0 (119–13) against John Higgins. During the final Williams compiled a 119 break, the highest in the tournament's history.

Prize fund
The breakdown of prize money for this year is shown below:
Winner: £10,000
Runner-up: £6,000
Semi-final: £4,000
Quarter-final: £3,500
Highest break: £2,000
Total: £40,000

Main draw
Players highlighted in bold are the match winners.

References

2006
Pot Black
Pot Black
Pot Black
Pot Black